Asterinella is a genus of fungi in the Microthyriaceae family. It is commonly found on decaying leaves or dead plants.

Species
As accepted by Species Fungorum;

 Asterinella bangii 
 Asterinella brasiliensis 
 Asterinella bredemeyerae 
 Asterinella caaguazensis 
 Asterinella caricifoliicola 
 Asterinella clemensiae 
 Asterinella contorta 
 Asterinella cupressina 
 Asterinella diospyrina 
 Asterinella entebbeensis 
 Asterinella epidendri 
 Asterinella evigilata 
 Asterinella formosana 
 Asterinella hapala 
 Asterinella hiugensis 
 Asterinella intensa 
 Asterinella ixorae 
 Asterinella leptotheca 
 Asterinella lugubris 
 Asterinella mimusopis 
 Asterinella mindanaensis 
 Asterinella palawanensis 
 Asterinella papayae 
 Asterinella parameriae 
 Asterinella phoradendri 
 Asterinella protiicola 
 Asterinella pseudospondiadis 
 Asterinella pterigotae 
 Asterinella puiggarii 
 Asterinella puyana 
 Asterinella quinta 
 Asterinella randiae 
 Asterinella stuhlmannii 
 Asterinella tecleae 
 Asterinella ugandensis 

Former species; 
Assume if not mentioned, all species are in the Asterinaceae family

 A. acokantherae  = Lembosina acokantherae, Lembosinaceae
 A. amazonica  = Prillieuxina amazonica 
 A. anamirtae  = Prillieuxina anamirtae
 A. antioquensis  = Asterina antioquensis
 A. ardisiae  = Prillieuxina ardisiae 
 A. argyreiae  = Prillieuxina argyreiae 
 A. asterinoides  = Prillieuxina asterinoides 
 A. baileyi  = Placoasterella baileyi 
 A. burchelliae  = Asterolibertia burchelliae 
 A. calami  = Prillieuxina calami 
 A. capizensis  = Prillieuxina capizensis 
 A. conocephali  = Prillieuxina conocephali 
 A. creberrima  = Prillieuxina creberrima 
 A. cryptocaryae  = Asterolibertia cryptocaryae 
 A. cylindrotheca  = Prillieuxina cylindrotheca 
 A. diaphana  = Prillieuxina diaphana 
 A. dipteridis  = Prillieuxina dipteridis 
 A. dipterocarpi  = Prillieuxina dipterocarpi 
 A. dissiliens  = Prillieuxina dissiliens
 A. distinguenda  = Prillieuxina distinguenda
 A. drimydis  = Leveillella drimydis 
 A. dysoxyli  = Prillieuxina dysoxyli 
 A. elaeagni  = Asterina elaeagni 
 A. flexuosa  = Prillieuxina flexuosa
 A. gmelinae  = Asterina gmelinae
 A. gracilis  = Prillieuxina gracilis
 A. hippeastri  = Prillieuxina hippeastri
 A. humiriae  = Prillieuxina humiriae
 A. hydnocarpi  = Prillieuxina hydnocarpi
 A. ilicicola  = Prillieuxina ilicicola
 A. inconspicua  = Prillieuxina inconspicua
 A. ixoricola  = Prillieuxina ixoricola
 A. jasmini  = Prillieuxina jasmini
 A. lembosioides  = Echidnodes lembosioides
 A. lepidotricha  = Prillieuxina lepidotricha
 A. loranthi  = Prillieuxina loranthi
 A. luzonensis  = Prillieuxina luzonensis
 A. mabae  = Prillieuxina mabae
 A. malabarensis  = Lembosia malabarensis
 A. manaosensis  = Prillieuxina manaosensis
 A. melastomacearum  = Prillieuxina melastomacearum
 A. microchita  = Prillieuxina microchita
 A. multilobata  = Prillieuxina multilobata
 A. nebulosa  = Microthyrium nebulosum, Microthyriaceae
 A. obesa  = Prillieuxina obesa
 A. phoradendri  = Prillieuxina phoradendri
 A. pinastri  = Stomiopeltis pinastri, Micropeltidaceae
 A. pterocelastri  = Prillieuxina pterocelastri
 A. puiggarii var. minor  = Asterinella puiggarii, Microthyriaceae
 A. ramuligera  = Asterina ramuligera
 A. rhaphiostylidis  = Prillieuxina rhaphiostylidis
 A. saginata  = Prillieuxina saginata
 A. santiriae  = Asterolibertia santiriae
 A. sublibera  = Asterina sublibera
 A. systema-solare  = Dothidasteromella systema-solare
 A. tetracerae  = Prillieuxina tetracerae
 A. tjibodensis  = Prillieuxina tjibodensis
 A. uleana  = Maublancia uleana, Microthyriaceae
 A. venusta  = Prillieuxina venusta
 A. winteriana  = Prillieuxina winteriana
 A. woodiana  = ''Asterina woodiana'

References

External links
Index Fungorum

Microthyriales